The 21st Grey Cup game was the Canadian football championship in 1933. Toronto Argonauts defeated Sarnia Imperials 4–3 at Sarnia's Davis Field on December 9 before a crowd of 2,751.

References 

Grey Cup
Sport in Sarnia
Grey Cup
1933 in Ontario
December 1933 sports events
Toronto Argonauts